Tomáš Hájovský (born 10 December 1982 in Lehota pod Vtáčnikom) is a Slovak footballer, who currently plays as a defender for Union Sparta Plzeň.

References

External links 
 
 Profile at iDNES.cz
 Tomáš Hájovský at Resultat

1982 births
Slovak footballers
FC Viktoria Plzeň players
FK Baník Sokolov players
Raith Rovers F.C. players
1. FK Příbram players
Czech First League players
Expatriate footballers in the Czech Republic
Living people
People from Prievidza District
Sportspeople from the Trenčín Region
Association football defenders